Hélène Island is a small rocky island  northwest of Ifo Island marking the west end of the Géologie Archipelago in Antarctica. It was photographed from the air by U.S. Navy Operation Highjump, 1946–47, was charted by the French Antarctic Expedition, 1949–51, and named by them for one of the expedition's dogs.

See also 
 List of Antarctic and sub-Antarctic islands

References

Islands of Adélie Land